is a train station in Takaharu, Nishimorokata District, Miyazaki Prefecture, Japan. It is operated by JR Kyushu and is on the Kitto Line.

Lines

Layout 
The station consists of an island platform serving two tracks at grade with a siding. The station building is a wooden structure of traditional Japanese design. It houses a waiting area, a shop as well as the offices of the Takaharu Town Tourism Association. Access to the island platform is by means of a level crossing with ramps. The station is not staffed by JR Kyushu but some types of tickets are available from the tourism association which acts as a Kan'i itaku agent.

Adjacent stations

History
Takaharu opened on the same day as one of several intermediate stations on the new track. On 6 December 1932, the same stretch was separated out and was designated as the Kitto Line with Miyakonojō as the starting point. With the privatization of Japanese National Railways (JNR), the successor of JGR, on 1 April 1987, Takaharu came under the control of JR Kyushu.

Passenger statistics
In fiscal 2016, the station was used by an average of 94 passengers (boarding only) per day.

See also
List of railway stations in Japan

References

External links

  

Railway stations in Miyazaki Prefecture
Railway stations in Japan opened in 1913